A disease is an abnormal condition that affects the body of an organism.

Disease or The Disease may also refer to:

 Disease (Beartooth album) or the title song, 2018
 Disease (G.G.F.H. album) or the title song, 1993
 The Disease EP or the title song, by the Eyes of a Traitor, 2011
 "Disease" (song), by Matchbox Twenty, 2002
 "Disease", a song by Hollywood Undead from Day of the Dead, 2015
 "Disease", a song by Insight 23 from Obsess, 1995
 "Dis-ease", a song by BTS from Be, 2020
 "The Disease", a song by Heaven Shall Burn from Iconoclast (Part 1: The Final Resistance), 2008
 "The Disease", an episode of Star Trek: Voyager

See also 
 List of diseases